Wallsend Football Club is a football club in Australia. They play in the Northern NSW State League Division 1 which is the second tier of competition in Northern NSW Football. They are the oldest football club in Newcastle.

Club

Colours 

The original club colours consisted of a red shirt with a white sash, white shorts and red and white socks. This strip was worn by the Wallsend Rovers, the original club name in 1887. The presence of red and white has been continuous, with evolving designs and styles always involving the use of these colours.

Ground 

Wallsend Football Club is based at The Gardens Sporting Complex, which was formerly used by the Newcastle Breakers until their demise. The ground has been developed into a multi-use greyhound and sports venue, not merely a site for football. The previous capacity to hold 11,000 spectators has dropped to one of 2,000, with 1,100 of those being seated.

Rivalries 
Wallsend Football Club's principal rivals are the nearby clubs of West Wallsend FC and Adamstown Rosebud FC, against whom they have been playing matches for over a century.

Wallsend's nearest rival in geographic terms is the club Plattsburg Marylands FC.

Honours

Major Premierships 

 NEWFM Northern League One Champions: 2
 2015, 2016
 State Premiers: 3
 1942, 1943, 1944
 Northern Premiers: 3
 1945, 1951, 1953
 State Premiership: 3
 1957, 1959, 1965
 State League Premiership: 2
 1932, 1933
 Northern League Premiership: 1
 1929

Other 

 Premiership Runners-Up: 11
 1930, 1949, 1954, 1956, 1971, 1976, 1980, 1984, 1985, 1994, 1995
 Minor Premierships: 4
 1951, 1965, 1985, 1994
 Club Championships: 2
 1994, 2003

Cup wins 

 Daniel's Cup: 16
 1938, 1939, 1940, 1941, 1942, 1943, 1950, 1951, 1955, 1956, 1957, 1958, 1961, 1962, 1963, 1964
 Ellis Cup: 5
 1889, 1919, 1920, 1923, 1924
 State Cup: 5
 1926, 1932, 1933, 1937, 1942
 Robinson Cup: 5
 1932, 1933, 1938, 1939, 1940, 1962
 Ampol Cup: 4
 1960, 1961, 1963, 1964
 Richardson Cup: 3
 1921, 1926, 1937
 State League Cup: 3
 1944, 1950, 1957(1)
 Gardiner Cup: 3
 1944, 1945, 1947
 Priest Cup: 3
 1943, 1944, 1945
 Sheahan Cup: 2
 1938, 1941
 Northern Cup: 2
 1931, 1932
 Badge Trophy: 2
 1900, 1903

note (1) 1957 winner of the NSW Association State Cup, after the breakaway from the NSW Federation

Current squad
"As of 4 April 2019"

Australian representatives 
A number of Wallsend have representational honours at various levels. In 1933 one Australian national team fielded five Wallsend players, being; C Edgetton, Winky Forrester, J Osborne, Jock Parkes, and Alf Quill. The match was played against New Zealand and ended as a draw with C Edgetton captaining the side and Alf Quill scoring both Australian goals.

 Les Burnett
 Reg Date
 C Edgetton
 Winky Forrester
 Ron Giles
 A Hearney
 Ernest [Dick] Kemp
 William [Bill] Mahoney
 A Mascord
 Jack O'Brien Snr
 Jack O'Brien Jnr
 J Osborne
 E Owens
 Hedley Parkes
 Jock Parkes
 Dan Rees
 Alf Quill
 Harold Whitelaw
 Hugh Whitelaw
 Jack Whitelaw

Olympians 

The Melbourne Olympic Games of 1956 saw two representatives from Wallsend Football Club play for Australia:

 George Arthur
 Bruce Morrow

Top Scorers per season

References

External links 
 

Soccer clubs in New South Wales
1887 establishments in Australia
Association football clubs established in 1887